NCAA Basketball: Road to the Final Four is a basketball video game. The game was a joint effort by Bethesda Softworks and Earl Weaver Baseball creators Mirage Graphics.

Development
The game was in development for three years.

Reception

Dennis Lynch from Chicago Tribune stated "Consequently, though it looks great, it soon becomes a bore. This is one basketball program that should be bounced.

German magazine Power Play stated "Basketball freaks should strike – those who want to become one should take a look – the extensive manual helps just fine. However, this program is not suitable for action athletes"

References 

1992 video games
Bethesda Softworks games
College basketball video games in the United States
DOS games
DOS-only games
NCAA video games
Video games developed in the United States
Video games set in 1990
Video games set in 1991